Bosic or Bosić is a surname. Notable people with the surname include:

 Andrea Bosic (1919–2012), Italian film actor of Slovene origin
 Boro Bosić (born 1950), Bosnian Serb politician
 Mladen Bosić (born 1961), Bosnian Serb politician
 Radivoj Bosić (born 2000), Serbian footballer